The men's 1500 metres event at the 1952 Olympics took place between July 24 and July 26. Fifty-two athletes from 26 nations competed. The maximum number of athletes per nation had been set at 3 since the 1930 Olympic Congress. The event was won by Josy Barthel of Luxemburg; to date, this is the only Olympic gold medal won by a Luxembourger, though Luxembourg-born Michel Théato is credited for winning the 1900 Marathon for France. Germany won its first medal in the 1500 metres with Werner Lueg's bronze.

Summary

The early leaders of the final were Audun Boysen followed by Warren Druetzler.  Towards the end of the first lap, Werner Lueg began to move up to take the lead, with Rolf Lamers on his shoulder to place a wall to control the pack.  Patrick El Mabrouk was next in line but unable to get by.  On the third lap Lamers was unable to maintain the pace as Josy Barthel and Roger Bannister exchanging elbows with El Mabrouk lined up behind Leug.  With 300 metres to go, Leug accelerated, opening up a 5-metre gap down the backstretch but through the final turn, Leug was unable to hold the pace allowing Barthel to catch back up.  Bob McMillen moved up from eighth place to catch the group of leaders at the head of the final straight.  Barthel went around Leug and sprinted to victory.  McMillen ran the long way around El Mabrouk and Bannister and was chasing Barthel down the straight.  Leug maintained his gap on Bannister and El Mabrouk, but looked helplessly as McMillen sprinted past, but he didn't have enough race left to catch Barthel, finishing half a metre behind but also being credited with the same time, a new Olympic record.

Background

This was the 12th appearance of the event, which is one of 12 athletics events to have been held at every Summer Olympics. Six of the finalists from the 1948 Games returned: bronze medalist Willem Slijkhuis of the Netherlands, fourth-place finisher Václav Čevona of Czechoslovakia, fifth-place finisher Bill Nankeville of Great Britain, and later places (the 1948 final's places after sixth are disputed) Sándor Garay of Hungary, Josy Barthel of Luxembourg, and Denis Johansson of Finland. Werner Lueg of Germany had tied the world record a month before the Games. "There was no favorite for the 1952 1,500 [metres], but the field had outstanding depth."

The Soviet Union, Thailand, and Venezuela each made their first appearance in the event. The United States made its 12th appearance, the only nation to have competed in the men's 1500 metres at each Games to that point.

Competition format

For the first time, the competition expanded to three rounds. There were six heats of between 7 and 10 runners each, with the top four runners in each advancing to the semifinals. This allowed the number of semifinals to be reduced to two and the number of runners in each to be standardized at 12. The top six runners in each semifinal advanced to the final, resulting in the typical 12-man final race.

Records

These were the standing world and Olympic records prior to the 1952 Summer Olympics.

During the final, Josy Barthel set a new Olympic record at 3:45.2. The top eight men in the final all surpassed the old (pre-World War II) Olympic record.

Schedule

All times are Eastern European Summer Time (UTC+3)

Results

Round 1
The first round was held on July 24. The fastest four runners in each heat advanced to the final round.

Heat 1

Heat 2

Heat 3

Heat 4

Heat 5

Heat 6

Semifinals

The fastest six runners in each heat advanced to the final round.

Semifinal 1

Semifinal 2

Final

References

Athletics at the 1952 Summer Olympics
1500 metres at the Olympics
Men's events at the 1952 Summer Olympics